Brachythecium is a genus of mosses belonging to the family Brachytheciaceae. The genus was first described by Wilhelm Philippe Schimper.

Species
The following species are recognised in the genus Brachythecium:
 Brachythecium albicans
 Brachythecium campestre
 Brachythecium erythrorrhizon
 Brachythecium glareosum
 Brachythecium latifolium
 Brachythecium mildeanum
 Brachythecium populeum
 Brachythecium reflexum
 Brachythecium rivulare
 Brachythecium rutabulum
 Brachythecium salebrosum
 Brachythecium tommasinii
 Brachythecium turgidum
 Brachythecium velutinum

References

Hypnales
Moss genera